Pássaro da Manhã is a theatrical one-act drama, written by Miguel M. Abrahão in 1978 and staged several times in Brazil. It was published in book form in 2009.

Plot summary
Pássaro da Manhã shows the trajectory of Tuca and Tom, two teenagers somewhere in the universe who philosophize about life, at the same time that, desperately, seek an identity and a hope for mankind in order to save her from a sad condition.  

This is a dramatic text which brings us the poetry and lyricism of a time lost. 

In 1984, João Vitti won the award for Best Actor at the Salesian Theatre Festival (São Paulo) with TOM character.

Bibliography
 COUTINHO, Afrânio; SOUSA, J. Galante de. Enciclopédia de literatura brasileira. São Paulo: Global; Rio de Janeiro: Fundação Biblioteca Nacional, Academia Brasileira de Letras, 2001: 2v.
 National Library of Brazil - Archives
 Sociedade Brasileira de Autores Teatrais

External links
  - Digital Library of Literature of UFSC
  ENCYCLOPEDIA OF THEATRE
 Brazilian Society of playwrights

Notes

1978 plays
Brazilian plays